303Project is an American UCI Continental cycling team established in 2014. It gained UCI Continental status in 2018.

Team roster

Major results
2018
Stage 3b Tour de Beauce, Griffin Easter

2019
Stage 4 Tour de Beauce, Griffin Easter

References

UCI Continental Teams (America)
Cycling teams based in the United States
2014 establishments in the United States